Marmora is an unincorporated community in Upper Township, in Cape May County, New Jersey, United States. It is part of the Ocean City Metropolitan Statistical Area. It is located at 39.258562, -74.659297. Its postal ZIP code is 08223. Its 1990 population was approximately 4,420 persons.

A post office was established in 1890, with James Corson as the first postmaster.

Demographics

Education
Upper Township School District operates public schools for K-8. Upper Township Primary School and Upper Township Elementary School have Marmora addresses while Upper Township Middle School has a Petersburg address. Ocean City High School of Ocean City School District has high school students from Upper Township.

Countywide schools include Cape May County Technical High School and Cape May County Special Services School District.

The Roman Catholic Diocese of Camden operates Bishop McHugh Regional School, a Catholic K-8 school, in Ocean View, Dennis Township, which has a Cape May Courthouse postal address. It is the parish school of Marmora/Woodbine Catholic Church and three other churches.

References

External links

 Marmora: an interactive aerial perspective from Virtual Earth
 Marmora: another aerial perspective from Virtual Earth
 The Upper Township Gazette, local community newspaper

Upper Township, New Jersey
Unincorporated communities in Cape May County, New Jersey
Unincorporated communities in New Jersey